Alexandra Tamposi (born November 17, 1989) is an American songwriter from West Palm Beach, Florida. She is best known for co-writing Kelly Clarkson's song "Stronger (What Doesn't Kill You)," 5 Seconds of Summer's song "Youngblood", DJ Snake's "Let Me Love You" featuring Justin Bieber, Camila Cabello’s "Havana" featuring Young Thug, and Cabello's "Señorita" with Shawn Mendes.  

Tamposi appeared on the final season of The X Factor as vocal coach and mentor to Simon Cowell's team, working alongside groups Restless Road, Sweet Suspense, and winners Alex & Sierra. She worked closely with Alex & Sierra on their debut album, writing four songs with the duo. In 2019, she won BMI Pop Songwriter of The Year.

She was featured on the Cedric Gervais single "Love Again".

She is the granddaughter of real estate developer Samuel A. Tamposi.

Songwriting discography

References

Songwriters from California
People from West Palm Beach, Florida
Writers from Los Angeles
Living people
Songwriters from Florida
American people of Romanian descent
1989 births